Luis Rosenkjer (born 7 August 1955) is an Argentine alpine skier. He competed in three events at the 1976 Winter Olympics.

References

1955 births
Living people
Argentine male alpine skiers
Olympic alpine skiers of Argentina
Alpine skiers at the 1976 Winter Olympics
Sportspeople from Bariloche